Pomatoschistus knerii, Kner's goby, is a species of goby native to the western basin of the Mediterranean Sea and the Adriatic Sea.  This species occurs in areas with soft substrates near to rocks or beds of seagrass. The specific name most likely honours the Austrian ichthyologist Rudolf Kner (1810-1869), who was a friend of the author Franz Steindachner.

References

Pomatoschistus
Marine fish of Europe
Fish of the Mediterranean Sea
Fish described in 1861
Taxa named by Franz Steindachner